Timothy Wirgau (born September 2, 1963 in Towanda, Pennsylvania) is an American politician and a former Republican member of the Tennessee House of Representatives, representing District 75 from January 2011 until January 2019. He was defeated by Bruce Griffey in the 2018 Republican primary.

Education
Wirgau earned his AA from Glen Oaks Community College.

Elections
2012 Wirgau was unopposed for the August 2, 2012 Republican Primary, winning with 2,890 votes, and won the three-way November 6, 2012 General election with 13,065 votes (56.3%) against Democratic nominee Steve Wright and Independent candidate James Hart.
2008 To challenge District 75 incumbent Democratic Representative Willie Borchert, Wirgau ran in the three-way August 7, 2008 Republican Primary, winning with 1,077 votes (81.2%), and won the three-way November 4, 2008 General election with 11,647 votes (50.5%) against Representative Borchert and Independent candidate James Hart.
2010 To challenge Representative Borchert again, Wirgau ran in the August 5, 2010 Republican Primary, winning with 5,201 votes (99.8%) against a write-in candidate, and won the November 2, 2010 General election with 10,122 votes (68.2%) against Representative Borchert.

References

External links
Official page at the Tennessee General Assembly
Campaign site

Tim Wirgau at Ballotpedia
Tim Wirgau at the National Institute on Money in State Politics

Place of birth missing (living people)
1963 births
Living people
East Tennessee State University alumni
Republican Party members of the Tennessee House of Representatives
People from Paris, Tennessee
People from Towanda, Pennsylvania
21st-century American politicians